Lophira is a genus of plants in the family Ochnaceae. Almost every part of Lophira (bark, root bark, leaves, and leafy shoots) is used for various medicinal purposes.

Species include:

 Lophira alata Banks ex C.F.Gaertn.
 Lophira lanceolata Tiegh. ex Keay. L. lanceolata is also known as false shea or meni oil tree.

References 

Ochnaceae
Malpighiales genera
Taxonomy articles created by Polbot
Taxa named by Joseph Banks
Taxa named by Karl Friedrich von Gaertner